Antenor Leitão de Carvalho is a Brazilian herpetologist and ichthyologist, born on 15 April 1910 and died on 11 December 1985 in Rio de Janeiro.

Taxa named in his honor 
 Pipa carvalhoi  
 Plecostomus carvalhoi 
 Discocystus carvalhoi 
 Bunocephalus carvalhoi 
 Mecynogea carvalhoi 
 Micrathena carvalhoi 
 Carvalhodesmus 
 Stenostreptus carvalhoi 
 Tityus carvalhoi 
 Arndtodesmus carvalhoi 
 Cynolebias carvalhoi 
 Cynolebias antenori 
 Harttia carvalhoi P. Miranda-Ribeiro, 1939 – a species of catfish
 Icthyocephalus antenori 
 Amphisbaena carvalhoi 
 Odontophrynus carvalhoi 
 Micrurus lemniscatus carvalhoi 
 Syncope antenori 
 Syncope carvalhoi 
 Bokermannohyla carvalhoi  
 Zachaenus carvalhoi 
 Panopa carvalhoi , 1990
 Dendrophryniscus carvalhoi 
 Colobosauroides carvalhoi

Taxa described 
Arcovomer 
Arcovomer passarellii 
Hamptophryne 
Hyophryne 
Hyophryne histrio 
Macrogenioglottus alipioi 
Macrogenioglottus 
Myersiella
Paratelmatobius 
Paratelmatobius lutzii 
Relictivomer 
Rhinella dapsilis 
Rhinella pygmaea 
Synapturanus 
Anolis phyllorhinus  
Siagonodon cupinensis

See also

:Category:Taxa named by Antenor Leitão de Carvalho

Biography 
Nomura, Hitoshi (1993). "A obra científica de Antenor Leitão de Carvalho (1910-1985)". Revista Brasileira de Zoologia 10 (3): 545–552. (in Portuguese). (texte)

Notes & references

Source
Biographical information is based on a translation from an equivalent article at the French Wikipedia.

Brazilian herpetologists
1910 births
1985 deaths